Zabrus jurjurae is a species of ground beetle in the Lobozabrus subgenus that is endemic to Algeria.

References

Beetles described in 1908
Beetles of North Africa
Endemic fauna of Algeria
Zabrus